Osteoma cutis is a cutaneous condition characterized by the presence of bone within the skin in the absence of a preexisting or associated lesion.

See also 
 Calcinosis cutis
 Skin lesion
 List of cutaneous conditions

References

External links 

Skin conditions resulting from errors in metabolism